Pal Orosz (25 January 1934 – 12 May 2014) was a Hungarian footballwe. He played for Hungarian National Olympic Football Team during the 1960 Summer Olympics in Rome, where they won the bronze medal.

Orosz died in Budapest, Hungary, from cancer, aged 80.

References

External links
 

1934 births
2014 deaths
Deaths from cancer in Hungary
Hungarian football managers
Hungarian footballers
Olympic footballers of Hungary
Footballers at the 1960 Summer Olympics
Olympic bronze medalists for Hungary
Olympic medalists in football
Raja CA managers
Medalists at the 1960 Summer Olympics
Association football forwards
Ferencvárosi TC footballers
Botola managers